Jessica Marie Garcia (born March 23, 1987) is an American actress. She made her acting debut as Sierra on the drama series Huge (2010), and subsequently played Becky on the sitcom The Middle (2012–2014). Her breakthrough came with playing Willow Cruz on the Disney Channel series Liv and Maddie (2013–2017), and she achieved mainstream success portraying Rhonda Navarro on the thriller series How to Get Away with Murder (2018–2019). She has received acclaim for starring as Jasmine Flores on the Netflix series On My Block (2018–2021), which earned her a Teen Choice Award nomination.

Early life 
Garcia was born on March 23, 1987, in Orlando, Florida. Garcia's father is of Mexican descent, while her mother is of Cuban descent. At the age of 19, Garcia moved to Los Angeles. Before pursuing acting, she worked at Olive Garden and a restaurant called The Counter, a job she continued while appearing on the show Liv and Maddie.

Career 
Garcia began acting in 2010, making her professional debut starring as Sierra, a recurring role, on the ABC Family drama series Huge, and in the same year starred as Lucero in the independent film Las Angeles. Following this, from 2012 to 2014, she starred as Becky in the ABC sitcom The Middle. During her appearances on The Middle, Garcia began appearing on the Disney Channel series Liv and Maddie as Willow Cruz, a role she played until 2017. Despite her character being a teenager, Jessica was 26 years old when the show began and 30 years old when it wrapped up. In 2017, she starred as Peaches in the film Avenge the Crows.

From 2015 to 2019, Garcia starred in and co-wrote episodes for the comedy sketch show Betch. In 2018, Garcia began appearing in the Netflix drama series On My Block as Jasmine Flores. Originally cast in a recurring role, Garcia was promoted to a series regular from the second season. For her performance, she was nominated for Choice Summer TV Actress at the 2019 Teen Choice Awards. In the same year, she portrayed Rhonda Navarro on the thriller series How to Get Away with Murder, a role she held until 2019. In 2020, Garcia began appearing in the Disney+ series Diary of a Future President as Camila.

Personal life 
In 2013, Garcia discovered that she was pre-diabetic, and to prevent getting diabetes, she lost over 70 pounds, stating that her career was her "biggest motivation to start living a healthier life."

In January 2016, Garcia became engaged to actor Adam Celorier, whom she married two years later in October 2018. She announced her first pregnancy in November 2021, and their daughter, Selena Grey, was born in February 2022.

Filmography

Film

Television

Awards and nominations

References

External links
 
 

1987 births
21st-century American actresses
Actresses from Orlando, Florida
American film actresses
American stage actresses
American television actresses
American people of Cuban descent
American actresses of Mexican descent
Living people